Le Grand Kallé et l'African Jazz, often simply referred to as African Jazz, was a popular and extremely influential Congolese rumba (soukous) band from the modern-day Democratic Republic of the Congo. Founded in 1953 in Léopoldville (modern-day Kinshasa) under Belgian colonial rule, the band was led by Joseph Kabasele Tshamala, popularly known by his stage name Le Grand Kallé. The group saw its heyday between 1958 and 1962, after which it was hit by defections by its members in 1963. It was briefly revived after 1966.

History
African Jazz emerged from the vibrant urban culture of Léopoldville during the last decade of Belgian rule in the Congo. Its music, driven by members of the rising African middle class, became popular during the move towards independence as an expression of rising national self-confidence. The new musical style, pioneered by the group, brought together foreign musical influences and western instruments with indigenous musical rhythms. The band itself was created at the initiative of Joseph Kabasele Tshamala, known as Le Grand Kallé, in 1953.

The band reached the apogee of its success between 1958 and 1962. Travelling to Belgium in 1960 at the time of negotiations on the Congo's independence, African Jazz was one of the first groups to introduce African popular music into the European market. The band produced the hit "Indépendance Cha Cha" soon afterwards.

During its early development, African Jazz maintained a strong rivalry with Leopoldville's other major "rumba orchestra", OK Jazz, led by Franco Luambo Makiadi. The rivalry manifested in a move towards different musical styles by both bands which would define the two schools of Congolese rumba that emerged in the period. African Jazz played an important role in introducing new musicians to the Congolese public. These included Nico Kasanda (known as Docteur Nico) and Tabu Ley Rochereau, both of whom would become important rumba musicians in their own right after the mid-1960s. Anthropologist Bob W. White has compared the "clean, cosmopolitan, modernist sound" of African Jazz by the mid-1960s with the "more rootsy traditionalist sound" of OK Jazz to illustrate the argument.

In July 1963, the African Jazz split with all its musicians leaving to form a new group, African Fiesta, leaving Kallé as African Jazz's only member. In 1966, Kallé reconstructed the band with a new group of musicians and embarked on an overseas tour, but the new group fell apart in 1967–68 with musicians leaving to form a new band.

Personnel

"Le Grand Kallé" (Joseph Kabasele) - vocals, bandleader
Dr Nico Kasanda - lead guitar
Manu Dibango - saxophone
Déchaud Mongala (Charles Mwamba) - guitar
Sam Mangwana - vocals
Tabu Ley Rochereau - vocals
Youlou Mabiala - vocals
Josky Kiambukuta - vocals
Pierre Yantunla - drums
Edouard Lutula - clarinet
Kalé-Roger - percussion
Pépé Kallé - vocals
Suzy Kaseya -  lead guitar

Discography
Singles
Indépendance Cha Cha
Table Ronde
African Jazz Mokili Mobimba
And dozens of others.
Contributing artist
 The Rough Guide to Congo Gold (2008, World Music Network)

See also
OK Jazz
African Fiesta
Rock'a Mambo
Empire Bakuba

References

Bibliography

Democratic Republic of the Congo musical groups
Soukous groups
1953 establishments in Africa
Musical groups established in 1953
Musical groups established in 1966
Musical groups disestablished in 1963
Musical groups disestablished in 1968
Culture of Kinshasa